The Battle of Kwatarkwashi was a decisive battle between the British administered Protectorate of Northern Nigeria and forces of the Sokoto Caliphate's Kano Emirate. The defeat of the Kano cavalry in the battle marked the formative end of the Kano Emirate.

Background
In 1899, Lord Lugard had proclaimed a British protectorate over much of the Sokoto Caliphate. With the failure of numerous diplomatic overtures to the Caliph, in 1900 a military campaign was launched to subdue the caliphate.  
when news of the Battle of Kano and the fall of the fort of Kano reached Sokoto in February 1903, the Kano cavalry embarked on a march to retake the city.

Battle
After three previous victorious encounters with British forces, a large British Force from Kano ambushed the Kano cavalry at the great rocks of Kwatarkwashi. After a 6-hour encounter, the death of the Vizier of Kano led the remnant of the cavalry to retreat back to Sokoto, a substantial part of the force however under Muhammad Abbas surrendered to the British and proceeded back to Kano.

At Kano, Muhammad Abbas was proclaimed Emir of Kano. The last of the Kano cavalry were integrated into the Caliphal force of Sokoto.

See also
Battle of Kano

References

Kwatarkwashi
Kwatarkwashi
Kwatarkwashi
History of Northern Nigeria
History of Kano
Politics of Northern Nigeria
1903 in Nigeria